Motithang College was a football club from Bhutan, based at Changlimithang, who played in the inaugural Bhutan A-Division, then the top level of football in Bhutan, but since replaced by a full national league.

History
They finished sixth in the inaugural season, winning two and drawing two of their nine games. They achieved victories over Education and T. I. and Power 1–0 whilst drawing with Public Works Department 0–0 and Yangchengphug College 1–1. They were somewhat lacklustre in attack, scoring only six goals throughout the entire season, only the bottom two clubs Education and Yangchengphug scored fewer. There are no records available for any competitions held between 1987–1995, so it is not known whether they competed again, and there is no record of them competing in any future season for which records exist.

References

Football clubs in Bhutan
Sport in Thimphu
University and college association football clubs